Two (Poverty) is the second release from Indianapolis thrash band Demiricous. It was released through Metal Blade Records in 2007. Like their debut, the album contains 12 tracks and is slightly over 40 mins. A noticeable difference between the previous album and the current album is that Olp's vocals have changed from a rasping growl to a barking growl, reminiscent of the kind of vocals that thrash metal bands have used in the past.

Track listing
"Never Enough Road" – 2:38
"Expression Of Immunity To God" – 1:44
"Knuckle Eye" – 3:35
"Leprosaic Belief" – 2:57
"Language Of Oblivion" – 3:48
"Tusk And Claw" – 3:12
"Appreciation For Misery" – 3:39
"Engineer" – 3:21
"Celebration Of Damage" – 2:41
"Acid Lung" – 3:25
"Stress Fetish" – 3:38
"Blackish Silver" – 5:27

References

2007 albums
Metal Blade Records albums
Demiricous albums
Albums produced by Erik Rutan